Router metrics are configuration values used by a router to make routing decisions. A metric is typically one of many fields in a routing table. Router metrics help the router choose the best route among multiple feasible routes to a destination. The route will go in the direction of the gateway with the lowest metric. 

A router metric is typically based on information such as path length, bandwidth, load, hop count, path cost, delay, maximum transmission unit (MTU), reliability and communications cost.

Examples
A metric can include:
 measuring link utilization (using SNMP)
 number of hops (hop count)
 speed of the path
 packet loss (router congestion/conditions)
 Network delay
 path reliability
 path bandwidth
 throughput [SNMP - query routers]
 load
 Maximum transmission unit (MTU)
 administrator configured value

In EIGRP, metrics is represented by an integer from 0 to 4,294,967,295 (The size of a 32-bit integer). In Microsoft Windows XP routing it ranges from 1 to 9999.

A metric can be considered as:
 additive - the total cost of a path is the sum of the costs of individual links along the path,
 concave - the total cost of a path is the minimum of the costs of individual links along the path,
 multiplicative - the total cost of a path is the product of the costs of individual links along the path.

Service level metrics 

Router metrics are metrics used by a router to make routing decisions. It is typically one of many fields in a routing table.

Router metrics can contain any number of values that help the router determine the best route among multiple routes to a destination. A router metric typically based on information like path length, bandwidth, load, hop count, path cost, delay, MTU, reliability and communications cost.

See also
 Administrative distance, indicates the source of routing table entry and is used in preference to metrics for routing decisions

References

External links
 Survey of routing metrics

Computer network analysis
Network performance
Metrics